WLNF (90.9 FM) is a radio station licensed to serve the community of Rapids, New York. The station is owned by Lockport Community Television. It airs a variety radio format.

The station was assigned the WLNF call letters by the Federal Communications Commission on November 27, 2008.

References

External links
 Official Website
 

LNF
Radio stations established in 2012
2012 establishments in New York (state)
Variety radio stations in the United States
Niagara County, New York